Antonio Grillo (born February 21, 1986 in Venaria Reale, Piedmont) is an Italian football defender who plays for Derthona.

Career
Ahead of the 2019-20 season, Grillo joined Derthona.

Appearances in Serie C2 and Serie D  

Serie C2 : 53 Apps, 1 Goal

Serie D : 100 Apps

References

External links
 
 

1986 births
Living people
People from Venaria Reale
Italian footballers
Serie C players
Serie D players
U.S. Alessandria Calcio 1912 players
F.C. Canavese players
Cavese 1919 players
S.S.D. Varese Calcio players
A.S.D. HSL Derthona players
Association football defenders
Pinerolo F.C. players
Footballers from Piedmont
Sportspeople from the Metropolitan City of Turin